James Higgins may refer to:

James Higgins (Australian cricketer) (1874–1957), Australian cricketer
James Higgins (English cricketer) (1877–1954), English cricketer
James Higgins (footballer) (1874–?), English footballer
James Higgins (rugby league) (born c.1922), rugby league footballer of the 1940s for Wakefield Trinity
James Higgins (Wisconsin politician) (1824–1910), member of the Wisconsin legislature
James A. Higgins (1889–1962), New York state senator
James B. Higgins (1920–1991), American football player and coach, college athletics administrator
James D. Higgins (1913–1974), politician and judge in Newfoundland, Canada
James H. Higgins (1876–1927), Rhode Island politician 
James W. Higgins (1896–1945), member of the Wisconsin legislature

See also
Jim Higgins (disambiguation)